The 4th Annual European Film Awards were given out in 1991.

Winners

European Film of the Year

Young European Film of the Year
 Toto the Hero, by Jaco van Dormael, Prod. Pierre Drouot & Dany Geys, Iblis Films Bruxelles, Belgium

European Actor of the Year
 Michel Bouquet - Toto the Hero

European Actress of the Year
 Clotilde Courau - Le Petit Criminel

European Supporting Actor of the Year
 Ricky Memphis - Ultra

European Supporting Actress of the Year
 Marta Keler - Virdzina

European Screen-Writer of the Year
 Jaco van Dormael - Toto the Hero

European Cinematographer of the Year
 Walther van den Ende - Toto The Hero

European Film Composer of the Year
 Hilmar Örn Hilmarsson - Börn Náttúrunnar (Children of Nature)

European Production Designers of the Year
Kreta Kjnakovic (sets) and Valerie Pozzo Di Borgo (costumes) - Delicatessen

European Film Editor of the Year
 Giancarla Simoncelli - Ultra

European Cinema Lifetime Achievement Award
 Alexandre Trauner

European Cinema Society Award of Merit
 La Quinzaine Des Realisateurs

European Documentary Film of the Year
 Usłyszcie mój krzyk (Hear My Cry), by Maciej Janusz Drygas, Prod. Film Studio Zodiak Warsaw, Poland

Special Mentions
 Crimes et Passions - La Cicatrice, by Mireille Dumas Prod. TF1 Paris, France
 The Wall, by Jürgen Böttcher, Prod. DEFA-Studio for Dokumentarfilme Berlin, Germany

European Film Awards ceremonies
1991 film awards
Potsdam
1990 in German cinema